Tanuše is a village in the municipality of Mavrovo and Rostuša, North Macedonia.

History 
In 1913, the imam of Tanuše, Malik Mema was the leader of an uprising in Upper Reka against Serbian military forces that managed to free all villages up to Zdunje, near Gostivar. During the 2001 insurgency in northern Macedonia, Macedonian armed forces and police desecrated part of the interior of the village mosque so as to prevent possible usage by Albanian National Liberation Army (NLA) units. Due to the village of Tanuše being affected by the conflict, some residents migrated thereafter to other places.

Demographics
As of the 2021 census, Tanuše had 2 residents with the following ethnic composition:
Albanians 2

According to the 2002 census, the village had a total of 16 inhabitants. Ethnic groups in the village include:

Albanians 16

See also 
Tanush (name)

References

Villages in Mavrovo and Rostuša Municipality
Albanian communities in North Macedonia